Edward John Meeman (October 2, 1889 – November 15, 1966) was an American journalist and editor.

Biography
Meeman was born in Evansville, Indiana. He served in the U.S. Navy during World War I, and upon returning went to work for the Evansville Press, first as a reporter and then as an editor. In 1921 he became editor of the Knoxville News daily paper, later known as the News-Sentinel, and then just Sentinel, and ten years later edited the Memphis Press-Scimitar. During his career he championed causes such as civil rights and environmental conservation, and fought to expose political corruption. He was nominated for a Pulitzer Prize in 1946.

He died on November 15, 1966, at age 77. After his death the Edward J. Meeman Foundation was created in his name to support journalism and conservation through grants and awards. The Edward J. Meeman Environmental Reporting Award has been given to various journalists since 1967 including Ken Ward Jr., Sam Roe, Bruce Ingersoll, James V. Risser, Larry Tye, and Craig Flournoy.

The Meeman Museum and Nature Center in the Meeman-Shelby Forest State Park in Tennessee is named after him.

His autobiography, The editorial we : a posthumous autobiography, was published after his death.

References

1889 births
1966 deaths
American journalists
American newspaper editors